Walter Kohut (20 November 1927 – 18 May 1980) was an Austrian film, television and theatre actor.

He appeared in many Austrian and German films over a 30-year period and became known for playing shady characters. He became known internationally for his portrayal of Field Marshal Walter Model in the 1977 Hollywood blockbuster A Bridge Too Far and for an appearance in the 1979 thriller Bloodline.

He was married to the actress Immy Schell, sister of Maria and Maximilian Schell, his co-star in A Bridge Too Far. He died aged 52 and his gravesite is located in the Mauer cemetery in Vienna.

Filmography

Death
During the filming of the film Panische Zeiten on January 14, 1980, he suffered a circulatory collapse, fell into a coma and died a few months later without having regained consciousness. He rests in Vienna on the Mauer cemetery (group 29, row 2, number 7) next to his wife.

External links

 

1927 births
1980 deaths
Austrian male film actors
Austrian male stage actors
Austrian male television actors
Male actors from Vienna
20th-century Austrian male actors
German Film Award winners
Deaths from circulatory collapse